Darren Stanley (born 2 February 1972) is a former Australian rules footballer who played with Footscray in the Victorian Football League (VFL).

Stanley, who Footscray secured from Coburg, appeared in three of the last four rounds of the 1991 AFL season. He then returned to Coburg and also had a stint in Western Australia with West Perth.

He had a decorated career in the Ballarat Football League. While at Melton South in 1998 he was awarded the Henderson Medal, a joint winner with Leigh Trethowan. Stanley joined rivals Melton in 2000 and won the medal again in his first year and was runner-up in 2001. In both of those years he was also a member of premiership teams. He announced his retirement at the end of the 2009 season.

References

1972 births
Australian rules footballers from Victoria (Australia)
Western Bulldogs players
West Perth Football Club players
Coburg Football Club players
Melton Football Club players
Living people